The following is a list of recurring Saturday Night Live characters and sketches introduced between September 28, 1996, and May 17, 1997, the twenty-second season of SNL.

The Ambiguously Gay Duo

A cartoon by Robert Smigel, part of the Saturday TV Funhouse series. Originally appeared on the Dana Carvey Show. Debuted September 28, 1996.

Appearances

Mr. Peepers

Mr. Peepers was a part-monkey/part-human character created and portrayed by Chris Kattan. His signature bits of physical comedy involved eating apples one after another in rapid succession, and spitting out the pieces machine gun style. Often he would spit the apple chunks directly at characters in the scene. His other physical act was dry humping other characters, with the recipient of the act getting reprimanded when they tried to push him off.

Mr. Peepers was first introduced as an animal act brought out by John Barbary (played by Tom Hanks) on a parody of The Tonight Show (with Darrell Hammond as Jay Leno).  In an episode in the 25th season, "Papa Peepers" (played by The Rock) was revealed to be Mr. Peepers's father. Another memorable sketch was a parody of an episode of Dawson's Creek, featuring Katie Holmes as Joey, the character she played on that show. On the Weekend Update segment of the May 17, 2003 episode, Chris Kattan performed a lightning-round montage of his most popular characters, and assumed the character of Mr. Peepers for a brief moment during that bit. It was the final episode of the 2002–2003 season, and also Kattan's last episode as a cast member.

Appearances

Kincaid
Played by Ana Gasteyer, Kincaid was a fast-talking MTV VJ. Sketch debuted September 28, 1996.

Gene, the Ex-Convict
A Colin Quinn sketch. Debuted October 5, 1996.

Appearances

The Quiet Storm
The Quiet Storm was a radio show hosted by Chris "Champagne" Garnett (Tim Meadows). Debuted October 19, 1996.

Appearances

The Culps
The Culps, or "The Culp Family Musical Performances", were recurring characters that appeared on SNL between 1996 and 2002, and were portrayed by Will Ferrell (as Marty Culp), and Ana Gasteyer (as Bobbi Mohan-Culp). Marty and Bobbi were an awkward, unstylish, married couple who served as music teachers at Altadena Middle School. In the sketches, they would perform prim, conservative medleys of modern pop, R&B or rap songs at various school functions, much to the embarrassment of their unseen son who attended the school; when Claire Danes hosted, she played their college-student daughter, embarrassed beyond words when her parents performed during Career Day.

Marty played the keyboard and sings backup, while Bobbi was the lead vocalist, who sang in a high-pitched, operatic style.  In between medleys, the Culps make comments to the audience of middle school students, often implying that the children are mocking them, most often by showing them the finger. Debuted November 2, 1996.

The Culps followed in the tradition of earlier skits that began with 1970s sketch Nick The Lounge Singer and continued in the 1980s with The Sweeney Sisters. The basic premise being that the singers, who usually perform in bottom-of-the-barrel gigs, sing modern songs in their own unique style, but are totally oblivious to how unstylish and "cheesy" their performances are.

Ferrell and Gasteyer reprised their roles in 2012 when Ferrell hosted the May 12th episode. The couple had a gig at an LGBT prom. They later returned for the 40th anniversary special on February 15, 2015 in a tribute of musical sketches.

Appearances

The Delicious Dish
The Delicious Dish is a culinary-themed radio show hosted by Margaret Jo McCullen (Ana Gasteyer) and Teri Rialto (Molly Shannon). The show is presented as a parody of public radio (and in particular, NPR), with very quiet, low-key hosts and dull, specialized subject matter. The pleasant, modest hosts are typically quite taken with the sometimes crushingly dry subject being discussed -- albeit in an extremely reserved (but unfailingly chipper) way. The SNL episode's host will play a guest appearing on "The Delicious Dish", who is typically portrayed as being just as uncharismatic as the hosts. When Molly Shannon left the show during the 2000–2001 season, Rialto was replaced by the new co-host Lynn Bershad, played by Rachel Dratch.

In an interview with the real NPR, Gasteyer cited The Splendid Table, and Good Food—a local program on member station KCRW—as influences on the sketch. She noted that because of the lack of commercials, a show could easily "take [its] time and explore a subject to the point that people want to weep with boredom".

The most well-known edition of the sketch featured host Alec Baldwin as the chef Pete Schweddy—whose store sells the Christmas dish "Schweddy Balls". The two hosts remained consistently oblivious to the various double entendres being used by Schweddy to describe the dish (relating to "balls" as a slang term for testicles), such as stating that the balls can be bought in a "sack", and boasting that "no one can resist my Schweddy Balls." In 2014, Rolling Stone named the "Schweddy Balls" sketch the 20th best SNL sketch of all-time, noting that "those who didn't get the joke on first utterance would get multiple chances." So iconic was this simple bit of wordplay that Ben & Jerry's produced an ice cream in honor of the skit in 2011" (although said flavor would also result in controversy among groups who felt that it was inappropriate for such a product).

Gasteyer and Shannon reprised their characters in a one-off revival of the sketch during the May 8, 2010 episode, with host Betty White playing guest Florence Dusty—a baker famous for her "dusty muffins".

Appearances

Shopping at Home Network
A Will Ferrell and Chris Kattan sketch. Debuted November 16, 1996.

Appearances

Cinder Calhoun
Portrayed by Ana Gasteyer, Calhoun was an activist, feminist singer who played at the Lilith Fair festival. In one episode, she is introduced as the warm-up act for the festival. Ultra-politically correct, she would go out of her way to pronounce ethnic-named cities in their native dialect and would frequently dedicate her songs to activist causes. On a Christmas episode she sang a song called "Christmas Chainsaw Massacre", referring to the "senseless cutting down of innocent trees for our twisted holiday pleasure". She also performed the anti-Thanksgiving song "Basted in Blood" in a duet with Sarah McLachlan, referencing in her introduction as being inspired by Fiona Apple's criticism of Butterball Turkey for having a 1-800 number for Turkey recipes. She professed her love for Garth Brooks in a song entitled "Adonis in Blue Jeans" when he hosted the show. Debuted November 23, 1996 in a Thanksgiving Song Auditions sketch.

Appearances

Celebrity Jeopardy!

A parody of the annual celebrity tournament of the television quiz show Jeopardy!. Debuted December 7, 1996.

Janet Reno's Dance Party
Janet Reno's Dance Party ("coming to you live, from my basement/the deck of a battleship") was an SNL sketch starring Will Ferrell as U.S. Attorney General Janet Reno. It aired four times and featured the song "My Sharona" by the Knack. Debuted January 11, 1997. During the dance party, Reno expressed an aversion to mosh pits and accused her youthful guests of lying during interviews.  While she opposed moshing, Reno did engage in stage-diving during one episode, warning the dancing youths below to brace themselves for "180 lb of pure Reno."  In most episodes, Darrell Hammond would make an appearance as then-President Bill Clinton, urging Janet to leave her basement and rejoin society; he would assure her that nobody blamed her for the events at Waco, to which Reno would respond, "DANCE PARTY TAKES AWAY WACO!". Notable guests included Donna Shalala (played by Kevin Spacey), who slow-danced with Janet; and Rudy Giuliani (played by himself), who lost to Janet in a boxing match.  The last time the sketch aired, January 20, 2001, which was her last day as Attorney General, Janet Reno herself made an appearance. Will Ferrell stated:

Appearances

The X-Presidents

A cartoon by Robert Smigel, part of the Saturday TV Funhouse series. Debuted January 11, 1997.

Appearances

The Atteburys
An Ana Gasteyer, Mark McKinney and Will Ferrell sketch. Debuted January 11, 1997.

Appearances

Wong & Owens, Ex-Porn Stars
A Jim Breuer and Tracy Morgan sketch. Debuted January 18, 1997.

The Zimmermans
The Zimmermans were a married couple portrayed by Chris Kattan and Cheri Oteri as Josh and Laura Zimmerman, they would often meet other couples in various settings.  Normal dialogue between the Zimmermans would often change course suddenly, as the couple work one another into a sexual frenzy which typically ends just as abruptly.  Each sketch typically ends with one or both members of the other couple finally adopting behavior similar to the Zimmermans after extensive baiting, at which point the Zimmermans become shocked and appalled by the other's display.

Episodes featuring The Zimmermans 
 February 15, 1997
 May 2, 1998 - featuring host Matthew Broderick and Molly Shannon as the Zimmermans' neighbors.
 October 24, 1998 - featuring host Ben Stiller and Ana Gasteyer as the Zimmermans' neighbors.
 February 13, 1999 - featuring host Brendan Fraser as a gym instructor.
 May 15, 1999 - featuring host Sarah Michelle Gellar and Chris Parnell as Karen and John Hopkins.
 October 16, 1999 - featuring host Heather Graham, and Will Ferrell as airplane passengers.
 February 19, 2000 - featuring host Ben Affleck  and Horatio Sanz as car salesmen.
 May 20, 2000 - featuring host Jackie Chan and Molly Shannon as an interracial couple.

The DeMarco Brothers
The DeMarco Brothers are played by Chris Kattan (Kyle) and Chris Parnell (Sean). The premise of the sketch is that the brothers are auditioning to be dancers on tour for a musical act (usually, whoever is the musical guest on the show that week). They would wear matching t-shirts with quotes or references to a particular song by the artist, and then play a tape of the artist's songs and proceed to dance to it. Their dancing can be described as interpretive, as they often act out a portion of the song's lyrics in the form of skits during their performance. The musicians generally detest their performances, cutting them off before ever getting through an entire song. However, two auditions were successful: In the January 20, 2001 sketch, Lenny Kravitz, while initially dismissive, empathizes with the pair and hires them over the vociferous objections of his tour manager (host Mena Suvari), while for the May 11, 2002 episode, in which host Kirsten Dunst joins them as their cousin Tamara, Eminem ended the audition with many of the same insults other artists had used to describe their performance — but since this was exactly what he wanted out of his backup dancers, they got the job. Debuted (solely Kattan) March 15, 1997.

Dominican Lou
Dominican Lou (played by Tracy Morgan) is the building superintendent at 1901 Burnside Avenue in The Bronx. Debuted March 22, 1997.

On Weekend Update in 1998, he attempted to sell Colin Quinn the signed 62nd home run ball of his fellow countryman Sammy Sosa for a million dollars, even though it was later discovered to be a foul ball hit by Gary Gaetti and signed Dominican Lou.

He also did the weather report in Good Morning, Bronx on February 10, 2001.

In October 17, 1998, Dominican Lou was impersonated by Chucky on Weekend Update.

Appearances

Goth Talk
A late-night Tampa Bay Public-access television cable TV show hosted by goth high school students Azrael Abyss, Prince of Sorrows (Chris Kattan), and Circe Nightshade (Molly Shannon). The show, recorded in Azrael's home, begins with the theme song "Bela Lugosi's Dead" by Bauhaus and a station identification bumper, from "Channel 33: Sunshine State Cable Access." The hosts speak in a melodramatic, woeful tone, and wear dark gothic fashion and black make-up. Azrael speaks in a grating, high-pitched voice and frequently makes noises like a cat. They try to be as dark and gothic as they can, making regular references to death and the macabre, but always end in matters that are quite in contrast to both, prompting them to end the show abruptly with the slogan "Stay out of the daylight!".

Recurring themes include Azrael's job at Cinnabon and interruptions by his bullying older brother Glenn (Jim Breuer), a stereotypical jock. Glenn ruins the goth mood by turning on the light in the garage and calling Azrael and Circe by their real names, Todd (Henderson) and Stephanie. Often the dark aspects of their lives are juxtaposed with their surroundings, such as the time they mused that "The Tampa Bay Lightning aren't very goth." The show's sponsor is a clothing store called "The Gloom Room," with the slogan "It's an orgy of the macabre... located right next to the Pizza Hut on Hibiscus Road."  Guests on the show are touted for their dark and sinister character, but are soon revealed to have regular pedestrian lives. Baron Nocturna (Will Ferrell) appeared in three sketches; Nocturna, whose real name is Gordy, is an employee at Cinnabon and a friend of Abyss and Nightshade. In one appearance, Nocturna was scheduled to appear on the show but was "pantsed" and thrown in their pool by Glenn and his friend (Chris Farley).

Appearances

Collette Reardon
A Cheri Oteri sketch. Debuted May 10, 1997. Collette Reardon was a disheveled middle-aged woman who appeared to be significantly impaired by some drug or mixture of drugs. In the first two sketches, she would show up in a pharmacy with a stack of numerous prescriptions for unbelievably large supplies and large doses of an assortment of drugs, most of which were notorious for being addictive. Some of the prescriptions would be for clearly recreational drugs, such as peyote buttons, that would not be available in a pharmacy. The pharmacist (played by the guest host of the episode) was naturally skeptical of the legitimacy of the prescriptions. Subsequently, she appeared on Weekend Update as an "expert" and in situations where her impairment was particularly inappropriate.

During the course of some of her appearances, it was mentioned that Ms. Reardon drove a school bus for a living.

Appearances:

May 10, 1997:  Host John Goodman as the skeptical pharmacist.
Oct. 18, 1997: Host Brendan Fraser as the skeptical pharmacist.
Nov. 14, 1998: Host Joan Allen. In this installment, Collette Reardon appears as a pharmaceutics "expert" on Weekend Update.
Apr. 10, 1999: Host John Goodman. Reardon again shares her expertise on Weekend Update.
Nov. 6, 1999: Host Dylan McDermott. Reardon is visited by a telephone repairman (McDermott) at her home.
Mar. 11, 2000: Host Joshua Jackson. Reardon embarrasses her nephew (Jackson) when she visits him at his school.

References

Lists of recurring Saturday Night Live characters and sketches
Saturday Night Live in the 1990s
Saturday Night Live
Saturday Night Live